Bush hog may refer to:
Brush hog, a machine
Bushpig, an animal